The French motorcycle Grand Prix is a motorcycling event that is part of the World Motorcycle Racing season.

The Grand Prix was held on different circuits in its history: on the Charade Circuit (Puy-de-Dôme) between 1959 and 1967, Le Mans circuit on numerous occasions since 1969, alternating with the Paul Ricard Circuit at Le Castellet, used it for the first time in 1973, the Circuit Paul Armagnac in Nogaro in 1978 and 1982 and the Circuit de Nevers Magny-Cours once in 1992. Since 2000 the race has been held at Le Mans on the Bugatti Circuit.

The event is due to take place at the Bugatti Circuit until at least 2026.

Official names and sponsors
1959–1960: Grand Prix de France de Vitesse (no official sponsor)
1962–1964, 1966–1967, 1972, 1974, 1978, 1983, 1985–1992, 1995–1996, 2009: Grand Prix de France (no official sponsor)
1970: Grand Prix de France Motocyclistes (no official sponsor)
1975–1977, 1980–1982, 1984, 1994, 1997–1999: Grand Prix de France Moto (no official sponsor)
2000–2001, 2003–2004: Grand Prix Polini de France (listed without a sponsor on the cover until 2001)
2002: Polini Grand Prix de France (listed without a sponsor on the cover)
2005: Grand Prix Alice de France
2006–2008: Alice Grand Prix de France
2010–2016: Monster Energy Grand Prix de France
2017–2018: HJC Helmets Grand Prix de France
2019–2020: Shark Helmets Grand Prix de France
2021–present: Shark Grand Prix de France

Formerly used circuits and layouts

Winners of the French motorcycle Grand Prix

Multiple winners (riders)

Multiple winners (manufacturers)

By year
A pink background indicates an event that was not part of the Grand Prix motorcycle racing championship.

References

External links

 
Recurring sporting events established in 1920
1920 establishments in France